Charles Marie Aloy Mulder (born 1 July 1897, date of death unknown) was a Belgian bobsledder and ice hockey player. He won two bronze medals in 1924: in the four-man bobsleigh event at the 1924 Winter Olympics and in ice hockey at the European Championship. He finished 16th in the four-man bobsleigh event at the 1928 Olympics.

References

Further reading
 Bobsleigh four-man Olympic medalists for 1924, 1932-56, and since 1964
 Wallenchinsky, David. (1984). "Bobsled: Four-Man". In The Complete Book the Olympics: 1896–1980. New York: Penguin Books. p. 559.

1897 births
Year of death missing
Belgian male bobsledders
Olympic bobsledders of Belgium
Bobsledders at the 1924 Winter Olympics
Bobsledders at the 1928 Winter Olympics
Olympic bronze medalists for Belgium
Olympic medalists in bobsleigh
Medalists at the 1924 Winter Olympics
Sportspeople from Antwerp
20th-century Belgian people